Animato is an album by jazz guitarist John Abercrombie with keyboardist Vince Mendoza and drummer Jon Christensen that was recorded in 1989 and released by ECM in 1990.

Reception
The Allmusic review by Michael G. Nastos awarded the album 3½ stars, stating, "An unusual but beautiful item in John Abercrombie's discography, and a coming out for Mendoza, Animato signals a different direction for the ECM label, enabling electronic sounds in a way they had never fully embraced prior". The Penguin Guide to Jazz awarded the album 4 stars, stating, "one of Abercrombie's most cohesive and swinging sets. He sounds completely in control of the music".

Track listing

Personnel
 John Abercrombie – guitar, guitar synthesizer 
 Vince Mendoza – synthesizer
 Jon Christensen – drums

References

ECM Records albums
John Abercrombie (guitarist) albums
1990 albums
Albums produced by Manfred Eicher